Alla Georgievna Gryaznova (born November 27, 1937 in Moscow, Soviet Union) is a Russian economist, full Ph.D. in Economics, a rector of Financial University under the Government of the Russian Federation (1985–2006).

Early life 
Alla Georgievna was born in Moscow in 1937. Her mother worked as an accountant, and her father was a driver. She has three younger siblings.

In 1955, she graduated from the Moscow Finance College. Then, in 1959, she graduated from the Moscow Financial Institute. From 1961 to 1964 she attended graduate school at the university.

Career 
From 1964 she served as Assistant, Department of Political Economy, Moscow Financial Institute.

In 1969 she became Senior Lecturer, Associate Professor at the Department of Political Economy.

In 1976 she became full Ph.D. in Economics.

From 1976 to 1985 she served as Vice-Rector for Research and International Relations.

From 1985 to 2006 she served as Rector of the Financial Academy.

In 2006 she became President, in 2021 – Honored President of Financial Academy, later Financial University under the Government of the Russian Federation.

Accomplishments 
Gryaznova made a significant contribution to the development of the theoretical foundations of many applied subjects, such as banking, economic analysis, auditing, accounting, and insurance.

Gryaznova initiated and led the process of developing of the concept of education in the field of finance and banking in Russia until 2010.

She headed the Academic council of the Financial Academy and served as chair of dissertation councils for defending candidate and doctoral dissertations in economic sciences.

Gryaznova is a major specialist in the field of economic sciences, the author of more than 300 scientific papers, monographs, textbooks and articles. Her three-volume monograph “Banking system of Russia. Banker's Handbook” was awarded the Prize of the President of the Russian Federation.

Alla Gryaznova is a prominent scientific and public figure in Russia. She is the Deputy Chairman of the Higher Attestation Commission of the Ministry of Education of the Russian Federation, Vice-President of the Academy of Management and Market, Member of the Association of Banks of Russia, Member of the International Fiscal Association, Member of the Asia-Pacific Economic Cooperation (APEC) inter-governmental forum.

Honors and awards 
 Order "For Merit to the Fatherland": 4th class (2002), 3rd class (2006).
 Honored Scientist of the Russian Federation (1997)

References

External links

 bankir.ru Alla Gryaznova: “Seven Russian finance ministers left the walls of our university” 
 Economic Chronicle: Alla Gryaznova 

1937 births
Living people
Honoured Scientists of the Russian Federation
Recipients of the Order "For Merit to the Fatherland", 4th class
Recipients of the Order "For Merit to the Fatherland", 3rd class
Russian educational theorists
Economists from Moscow
Financial University under the Government of the Russian Federation alumni
Rectors of the Financial University under the Government of the Russian Federation
Soviet economists
Soviet educational theorists